The Field Guide To Evil is a 2018 anthology horror film produced by Legion M. Eight film makers from different countries bring stories or folk tales from their country to the anthology.

Plot 
The film comprises treatises on forbidden love, Greek underworld goblins, medieval Hungarian cobblers and US hillbilly folklore.

The stories and filmmakers come from:
 
 Austria: "The Sinful Women of Hollfall", directed by Veronika Franz and Severin Fiala
 Turkey: "Haunted by Al Karisi: The Childbirth Djinn", directed by Can Evrenol
 Poland: "The Kindler and the Virgin", directed by Agnieszka Smoczynska
 United States: "Beware of The Melonheads", directed by Calvin Reeder
 Greece: "Whatever Happened to Panagas the Pagan", directed by Yannis Veslemes
 India: "The Palace of Horrors", directed by Ashim Ahluwalia
 Germany: "A Nocturnal Breath", directed by Katrin Gebbe
 Hungary: "Cobbler’s Lot", directed by Peter Strickland

Cast 
 Birgit Minichmayr as Mutter 
 Claude Duhamel as Loni 
 Jilon VanOver as Chris
 Fatma Mohamed as Boglarka
 Niharika Singh as Sadhvi

Reception 
The critical reception has been mostly positive, receiving  rating on Rotten Tomatoes. Opening at the SXSW Festival, the film was nominated for the SXSW Gamechanger Award.

References

External links
 
 

Films based on urban legends
Horror anthology films
2018 films
Folk horror films
New Zealand horror films
2018 horror films